Latest Night News (Italian: Ultimissime della notte) is a 1924 Italian silent action film directed by Emilio Ghione and starring Ghione and Kally Sambucini. It is part of the long-running series featuring the gentleman thief Za La Mort, who in this film takes on the role of an investigative journalist.

Cast
 Emilio Ghione as Za La Mort
 Kally Sambucini as Za La Vie 
 Rita D'Harcourt
 Camillo De Paoli
 Alberto Pasquali
 Vittorio Rossi Pianelli

References

Bibliography 
 Moliterno, Gino. The A to Z of Italian Cinema. Scarecrow Press, 2009.

External links 
 

1924 films
Italian action films
Italian silent feature films
1920s Italian-language films
Films directed by Emilio Ghione
1920s action films
Italian black-and-white films
1920s Italian films
Silent action films